Arnold Brian Burrowes  (5 October 1896 – 15 November 1963) was an eminent bishop in the mid part of the Twentieth century.

Early life
He was born on 5 October 1896 and educated at Wellington and Corpus Christi College, Oxford. His family came from County Cavan in Northern Ireland.

Career

Military service
Burrows saw active service during World War I. On 5 August 1916, he was commissioned into the Royal Irish Fusiliers as a second lieutenant (on probation). On 19 April 1917, he was promoted to temporary lieutenant while attached to an officer cadet battalion. He was promoted to lieutenant on 5 February 1918. He was promoted to acting captain on 18 October 1918 and was seconded from his regiment as an Assistant Area Anti-Gas Officer.

On 29 July 1942, he was appointed a temporary military chaplain in the Royal Navy Volunteer Reserve with seniority from 29 July 1941. In the 1946 King's Birthday Honours, he was appointed Officer of the Order of the British Empire (OBE) in recognition of his service during World War II as a Navy chaplain.

Religious life
He was Fellow, Lecturer, Dean and Chaplain of Pembroke College, Oxford until 1937. He was also a Senior Proctor of the University of Oxford. He then served as Principal of Salisbury Theological College. After serving during as a military chaplain during World War II, he was appointed Bishop of St Andrews, Dunkeld and Dunblane in 1950.

Retiring five years later on grounds of ill-health, he died on 15 November 1963 in Elgin, Morayshire. He was buried in Elgin Cemetery, New Elgin, Morayshire.

References

 

1878 births
1963 deaths
British Army personnel of World War I
People educated at Wellington College, Berkshire
Royal Irish Fusiliers officers
Alumni of Corpus Christi College, Oxford
Fellows of Pembroke College, Oxford
Bishops of Saint Andrews, Dunkeld and Dunblane
20th-century Scottish Episcopalian bishops
Royal Naval Volunteer Reserve personnel of World War II
Officers of the Order of the British Empire
Royal Navy chaplains